Darren Lewis (born 1967) is a baseball player.

Darren Lewis may also refer to:

 Darren Lewis (American football) (born 1968), retired running back
 Darren Lewis (songwriter), co-writer of Smile (Lily Allen song) and Ay Yo